Ahangar Kola-ye Now Kandeh (also Romanized as Āhangar Kolā-ye Now Kandeh; also known as Āhangar Kolā) is a village in Nowkand Kola Rural District, in the Central District of Qaem Shahr County, Mazandaran Province, Iran. At the 2006 census, its population was 572, in 144 families.

References 

Populated places in Qaem Shahr County